Shahpura Assembly constituency is one of the 230 Vidhan Sabha (Legislative Assembly) constituencies of Madhya Pradesh state in central India. Current Member of Legislative Assembly of Shahpura is Bhoopendra Maravi from Indian National Congress.

It is part of Dindori District.

Members of Legislative Assembly

See also
 Shahpura, Dindori

References

Assembly constituencies of Madhya Pradesh